Gmina Michałowice may refer to either of the following rural administrative districts in Poland:
Gmina Michałowice, Lesser Poland Voivodeship
Gmina Michałowice, Masovian Voivodeship